The Second Nicaraguan Campaign Medal is a campaign medal of the United States Navy which was authorized by an act of the United States Congress on 8 November 1929.  The Second Nicaraguan Campaign Medal was awarded for service during operations in Nicaragua from 1926 to 1933, during the Nicaraguan civil war and the subsequent occupation. An earlier campaign medal, the Nicaraguan Campaign Medal, was awarded for service in Nicaragua 1912.

History
The Second Nicaraguan Campaign Medal was created by General Orders 197 of the Navy Department and approved by Congress to recognize participation by Navy and Marine Corps personnel in naval operations at Nicaragua between the dates of 27 August 1926 and 2 January 1933.

Appearance
The Second Nicaraguan Campaign Medal appeared as a medal suspended from a red ribbon with several white stripes.  The medal displayed a woman (representing Columbia), armed with a sword, defending two other figures with a cloak. The medal bore the words Second Nicaraguan Campaign with the dates 1926 – 1930 displayed on the medal's edges (although the medal was authorized until 1933).

Criteria
To be awarded the Second Nicaraguan Campaign Medal, a service member must have either served ashore during the specified period or on a United States ship, or as an embarked Marine, in the waters or land territory of Nicaragua during the aforementioned dates.

The Second Nicaraguan Campaign Medal was considered a separate award from the first version of the medal and Navy regulations permitted the receipt and wear of both medals, if so authorized. Rear Admiral W. H. H. Southerland, who had been in overall command of both Nicaraguan campaigns, was the first recipient of both versions of the Nicaraguan Campaign Medal.

No ribbon attachments or devices were authorized.

Eligible ships
The crews of the following ships were awarded the Second Nicaraguan Campaign Medal for service during the noted periods of time:

References

United States campaign medals
Nicaragua–United States relations